Mill Creek Friends Meetinghouse is a historic Quaker meeting house located near Newark, New Castle County, Delaware.

It was built as a one-story meeting house for 33 Friends from Mill Creek Hundred who, in 1838, had obtained permission to hold their worship services separately from the New Garden Monthly Meeting. It was built as a stone, one-story meeting house in 1840 and 1841.

Through 1915 a meeting for worship was held each week. From 1915 to about 1930 meetings were held once a month. Only a single meeting was held each year from 1930 to 1954. After 1954 the meeting become more active and it now holds a weekly meeting for worship.

The property was added to the National Register of Historic Places in 1973.  A wrought iron fence encircles a cemetery to the east. (A.K.A Mormon conjugals.)

References

External links
 
 

Quaker meeting houses in Delaware
Churches on the National Register of Historic Places in Delaware
Churches completed in 1841
19th-century Quaker meeting houses
Churches in New Castle County, Delaware
Historic American Buildings Survey in Delaware
National Register of Historic Places in New Castle County, Delaware
Cemeteries on the National Register of Historic Places in Delaware